St. Patrick's Roman Catholic Church is a historic Roman Catholic church located near Cowansville in Sugarcreek Township, Armstrong County, Pennsylvania within the Diocese of Greensburg.

Description
St. Patrick's was built in 1805, and is a log building measuring 22 feet by 35 feet.  It has a gable roof and three windows on each side. It is the oldest Catholic church still standing in Western Pennsylvania.

It was listed on the National Register of Historic Places in 1978.

References

Churches on the National Register of Historic Places in Pennsylvania
Roman Catholic churches in Pennsylvania
Churches in Armstrong County, Pennsylvania
19th-century Roman Catholic church buildings in the United States
1805 establishments in Pennsylvania
Roman Catholic churches completed in 1805
National Register of Historic Places in Armstrong County, Pennsylvania